Matthew Adam Tavares (born September 15, 1990), also known as Matty, is a Canadian musician, songwriter, and music producer. He is best known as a founder of the instrumental group BADBADNOTGOOD, with whom he released five studio albums and produced with for other artists. Tavares released his first solo album in 2018 and has since released a series of solo and collaborative genre-spanning albums. As a songwriter, he has helped pen songs for the likes of Post Malone, Rosalía, Camilla Cabello, Kendrick Lamar, and Kali Uchis, and often works with producer Frank Dukes.

Life and career 
Matthew Adam Tavares was born on September 15, 1990, and grew up in Mississauga, Ontario where he attended the local preparatory school Mentor College. He attended Humber College where he studied jazz performance and later met drummer Alexander Sowinski and bassist Chester Hansen in the program. In 2010, they formed BADBADNOTGOOD. The band had viral success in 2011 after posting jazz covers of Odd Future online, and released their debut record that Fall. He withdrew from school in February 2012.

With BBNG, Tavares released five full-length albums, including a collaborative record with Ghostface Killah, and was short-listed for the Polaris Music Prize twice. Following the release of their album IV in 2016, Tavares stepped away from touring with the group, and took time to focus on producing music as well as developing his solo project Matty. However, he did make live appearances with BBNG from time-to-time, playing at the likes of Massey Hall in 2017, and the Virgil Abloh-curated Louis Vuitton Spring/Summer runway show, and in Tokyo in 2018, among other venues.

Tavares has worked as a songwriter and music producer throughout his career, often producing tracks as part of BBNG and with producer Frank Dukes. Major early placements include tracks by Wu-Tang Clan, and Daniel Caesar, followed by songs by Kendrick Lamar, Taylor Swift, Post Malone, and Rosalía.

Tavares released his debut solo record in 2018, Déjàvu, under the name Matty. The project utilized the other members of BBNG as the backing band. That year, he also scored the CBC ten-part video game docuseries The Artists. Following a series of singles released after the record, Tavares began using his full name for some of his solo work. In October 2019, Tavares announced his departure from BBNG. In 2020, he released three full-length solo albums as well as two  collaborative jazz albums with former BBNG bandmate Leland Whitty. In 2020, he was nominated for a Latin Grammy for his work production work on the Rosalía song "Dolerme".

Tavares is based in Toronto.

Discography

As lead artist 
Studio albums
 Déjàvu (2018) (as Matty)
Visions (2020) (with Leland Whitty)
 Richard Dry (2020)
 Mississauga (2020)
 Selected Ambient Squirts (2020) (as Matty)
January 12th (2020) (with Leland Whitty)
  Danica (2021) (as Matty)

With BADBADNOTGOOD 

 BBNG (2011)
 BBNG2 (2012)
 III (2014)
 Sour Soul (with Ghostface Killah) (2015)
 IV (2016)

Other projects 
 Score of CBC documentary series The Artists (2018)
 Homer – Best New Music (2019)
Kingsway Music Library – Matthew Tavares Vol. 1 (2019)
Kingsway Music Library – Parkscapes Vol. 2 (Matthew Tavares) (2020)
Other sample compilations
Dandelion - All You Know (2022)

Production discography

Production and songwriting 
Selected discography. For additional credits, see the BadBadNotGood production discography (2011–2020).

 indicates a featured artist contribution.

"—" denotes production of the entire album/release.

"†" denotes credit as co-producer or additional production.

"‡" denotes credit as songwriter only.

Other credits 
 Black Atlass – "Burning Man" from Young Bloods (2014); mixing
 Eschaton –  ∆ (2014); guitar, keys
 Eschaton –  "Toronto, Ottawa, Low" from Tour Tape Two (2015); synth
 Kingsway Music Library – "Terco," "House Of Lawd," and "Dark Massage" from Colors (2015); keys
 River Tiber – "No Talk" from Indigo (2016); mixing
 Eschaton – Torus (2016); engineering, mixing, bass guitar
 Kilmanjaro – A Place Unknown To All You Ever Say (2017); mastering
 Katie McBride – "The Skyline" and "N.B.S.L." from World of Dreams (2018); drum production

Notes

References 

1990 births
Living people
Canadian male pianists
Musicians from Mississauga
21st-century Canadian pianists
21st-century Canadian male musicians